is a Japanese football player. He plays for Sutherland Sharks.

Club statistics
Updated to 20 February 2017.

References

External links

Profile at Gainare Tottori
Profile at Nara Club

1988 births
Living people
Doshisha University alumni
Association football people from Hyōgo Prefecture
Japanese footballers
J1 League players
J2 League players
J3 League players
Japan Football League players
Vissel Kobe players
Gainare Tottori players
Nara Club players
Association football defenders